The 1989 McDonald's Open took place at PalaEUR in Rome, Italy.

Participants

Games
All games were held at the PalaEUR in Rome, Italy.

Final standings

Sources
Nuggets to the final
Denver vs Barcelona 
Results
1989 Final

External links
NBA International Pre-Season and Regular-Season Games
List of champions at a-d-c

1989–90
1989–90 in American basketball
1989–90 in Italian basketball
1989–90 in Spanish basketball
1989–90 in Yugoslav basketball
International basketball competitions hosted by Italy